Grammopelta is a genus of moths in the family Saturniidae first described by Rothschild in 1907.

Species
?Grammopelta cervina Rothschild, 1907
Grammopelta lineata (Schaus, 1906)

References

Arsenurinae